Adriana Roel (4 July 1934 – 4 August 2022) was a Mexican actress from the Golden Age of Mexican cinema. Her roles included the Mexican telenovela Huracán.

Filmography
 No quiero dormir sola (She Doesn't Want to Sleep Alone) 2012
 Alucarda (Sisters of Satan) (Innocents from Hell) (Mark of the Devil 3) 	1978
 Kaliman - El Hombre Increible 1972
 Kaliman 1972
 Gregorio and His Angel 1968
 El Hijo Prodigo  1968
 24 Horas de Vida 1967
 Viva Maria! playing Janine 1965
 Autumn Days (Dias de Otono) 1963
 El planeta de las mujeres invasoras (Planet of the Female Invaders).
 Chucho el Roto (1960)

References

External links

1934 births
2022 deaths
20th-century Mexican actresses
Mexican telenovela actresses
Mexican stage actresses
Actresses from Monterrey